The Smojphace EP is a 2003 EP by electronic music artist Richard D. James under one of his commonly known aliases, AFX. The EP was released through MEN Records, a Rephlex Records sublabel.

Smojphace's first track is a remix of "Run The Place Red", a track produced by The Bug with vocals by Daddy Freddy. The remix is done in a breakcore style, before disintegrating into static noise near the end of the track. Both of the remaining "ktpa"  electronic tracks consist of synthesized noise.

The entire disc is black, including the part that is read by the CD player. Likewise, the label is black on both sides of the 12" vinyl.

Track listing

See also
Richard D. James discography

References

External links
 

2003 EPs
Aphex Twin EPs
Rephlex Records EPs